Thirty-seven scholars and artists across 18 states were awarded Guggenheim Fellowships in 1926.

Fellows

See also
 Guggenheim Fellowship
 List of Guggenheim Fellowships awarded in 1925
 List of Guggenheim Fellowships awarded in 1927

References

1926
1926 awards
1926-related lists